Corie Miguel Mapp (born 1978) is an international para-athlete and former Lance Corporal in The Life Guards, the senior regiment of the Household Cavalry and the British Army. He is a Para bobsleigh World Cup winner who in 2020 became Britain's first European Champion in Para Bobsleigh.
Born in Bridgetown, Barbados, Mapp came to Britain in 2005 to join the Army where he was the first Barbadian to ride on the Queen's Birthday Parade (Trooping the Colour) and on other mounted State ceremonial duties.

In 2008, he was posted as a combat vehicle driver to the Household Cavalry Regiment in Windsor, which was deployed to Helmand Province, Afghanistan, in late 2009. While on active duty there in early 2010 he lost both legs when his military vehicle ran over an explosive device.
Mapp was unconscious for two weeks but within a month of his injury was starting to walk on prosthetic legs.

He later competed in athletics and sitting volleyball for the British Army in the 2013 Warrior Games, and the first two Invictus Games. 
in 2020 Mapp joined Wilshire Police as a fulltime Police Community Support Officer and is hoping to become a regular policeman in 2022.
His autobiography Black Ice, written with former Life Guard and military historian, Christopher Joll was published in October 2021.

References

Living people
1978 births
Sportspeople from Bridgetown
British Life Guards soldiers
British Army personnel of the War in Afghanistan (2001–2021)